Herpetogramma piasusalis is a moth in the family Crambidae. It was described by Francis Walker in 1859. It is found in Australia, where it has been recorded from Queensland. It has also been recorded from Indonesia (Java), Kenya, Madagascar and Zambia.

References

Moths described in 1859
Herpetogramma
Moths of Australia
Moths of Africa
Moths of Indonesia